Aaron Delmas Jones II (born December 18, 1966) is a professional football player who played in the NFL. He went to high school at Apopka High School. He played as a defensive end and a linebacker for the Pittsburgh Steelers, New England Patriots, and Miami Dolphins.  His son Mike Jones played linebacker for the Michigan Wolverines football team.<ref>{{Cite web |url=http://www.mgoblue.com/sports/m-footbl/mtt/jones_mike00.html |title="/>

References

American football defensive ends
American football linebackers
Eastern Kentucky Colonels football players
Pittsburgh Steelers players
New England Patriots players
Miami Dolphins players
1966 births
Living people